Stanley Collins (6 March 1909 – 2 June 1993) was a South African cricket umpire. He stood in one Test match, South Africa vs. New Zealand, in 1954.

See also
 List of Test cricket umpires

References

1909 births
1993 deaths
Sportspeople from Cape Town
South African Test cricket umpires